Mongolian National Olympic Committee is the National Olympic Committee representing Mongolia.

History
The Mongolian National Olympic Committee was established on February 26, 1956, and sanctioned by the MPRP Central Committee and the Council of Minister of the People's Republic of 2-joint 42/37 on April 26, 1956. It has since become an independent non-government organization in order to comply with the International Olympic Games Charter and Rules.

Initially, national sports associations were established to promote development and participation by youth and adults. These then evolved to focus on participation in international sports. Mongolian athletes have been involved in regular games in Asia since 1972 and have participated in 13 Winter Olympic Games and 12 Summer Olympic Games.

Library

The library contains books, magazine, and texts from ancient to modern times. Topics covered range from scientific reports, to sport and athlete histories. Over 10-thousand publications compose a rich library. As well, the Rings Newspaper is kept stocked.

References

External links 
Mongolian National Olympic Committee Official Site

Mongolia
Oly
Mongolia at the Olympics
1956 establishments in Mongolia
Sports organizations established in 1956